Ion "Jean" Lăpuşneanu (December 8, 1908 in Bucharest – February 24, 1994)  was a Romanian football goalkeeper.

Career
His career in club football was spent at Venus București, Banatul Timișoara, Sportul Studenţesc București, Venus București, Rapid București
and Gloria CFR Galaţi.

International career
Ion Lăpuşneanu played 10 games at international level for Romania, making his debut when coach Constantin Rădulescu used him on 15 September 1929 in a friendly which ended with a 3–2 victory against Bulgaria. He played two games at the successful 1929–31 Balkan Cup, two at the 1932 Balkan Cup and one at the 1931–1934 Central European Cup for Amateurs. Lăpuşneanu was also part of Romania's 1930 World Cup squad in which he played in both of Romania's games at the tournament, the 3–1 victory against Peru and the 4–0 loss against eventual tournament winners Uruguay. His last game for the national team was a friendly which ended with a 5–0 loss against Poland. 

In 1942 Lăpuşneanu was coach of Romania's national team, leading the team in three friendly games, a 7–0 loss against Germany, a 1–0 loss against Slovakia and a 2–2 against Croatia.

Honours
Venus București
Divizia A (2): 1931–32, 1933–34
Rapid București
Divizia A runner-up (1): 1936–37
Cupa României (1): 1936–37
Romania
Balkan Cup: 1929–31
Central European International Cup: 1931–34

References

External links

Footballers from Bucharest
Romanian footballers
Romania international footballers
1930 FIFA World Cup players
Liga I players
Liga II players
Venus București players
Banatul Timișoara players
FC Sportul Studențesc București players
FC Rapid București players
Gloria CFR Galați players
1908 births
1992 deaths
Romanian football managers
Romania national football team managers
FC Argeș Pitești managers
FC Politehnica Timișoara managers
CSM Jiul Petroșani managers
Association football goalkeepers